Yellowjackets is the self-titled debut album by the American jazz group Yellowjackets issued in June 1981 by Warner Bros. Records. The album reached No. 16 on the Billboard Jazz Albums chart.

Track listing

Personnel 
Yellowjackets
 Russell Ferrante – keyboards
 Robben Ford - guitars
 Jimmy Haslip – bass
 Ricky Lawson – drums

Additional musicians
 Larry Williams – synthesizer programming, tenor saxophone, flute, horn arrangements 
 Bobby Lyle – acoustic piano (3)
 Roland Bautista – guitar (3)
 Lenny Castro – percussion
 Paulinho da Costa – percussion
 Ernie Watts – tenor saxophone  (1)
 Gary Herbig – tenor saxophone, flute
 Kim Hutchcroft – baritone saxophone, tenor saxophone 
 Bill Reichenbach Jr. – trombone, horn arrangements
 Jerry Hey – trumpet, flugelhorn, flugelhorn solo (5)

Production 
 Producer – Tommy LiPuma
 Rhythm Tracks recorded by Lee Herschberg
 Additional Recording – Stuart Gitlin and Al Schmitt 
 Assistant Engineer – Stuart Gitlin
 Mixed by Al Schmitt at Capitol Studios (Hollywood, California).
 Mix Assistant – Don Henderson 
 Mastered by Mike Reese at The Mastering Lab (Hollywood, California).
 Production Coordinator – Noel Newbolt 
 Art Direction and Design – Simon Levy 
 Logo Design – Mike Manoogian
 Illustration – J. Daniel Chapman

Charts

References

1981 debut albums
Albums produced by Tommy LiPuma
Instrumental albums
Warner Records albums
Yellowjackets albums